Tisis luteella is a moth in the family Lecithoceridae. It was described by Snellen in 1903. It is found on Java and Sabah.

The wingspan is 17–24 mm. The forewings are clay-yellow, with dark crosslines in the cell. The hindwings are clay colored.

References

Moths described in 1903
Tisis